Samuel Jacob Schultz (9 June 1914 – 24 June 2005) was an American Old Testament scholar. He was a professor at Wheaton College, Illinois from 1949 to 1980, and emeritus professor from 1980.

Samuel Jacob Schultz was born in Mountain Lake, Minnesota and studied at Bethel College and Harvard Divinity School.  He taught at Gordon College, Bethel College and St. Paul Bible College before going to Wheaton. He was an ordained minister, and was a member successively of the Christian & Missionary Alliance, the Baptist General Conference and the Conservative Congregational Christian Conference.

Schulz wrote The Old Testament Speaks (1960), as well as the Leviticus and Deuteronomy volumes of the Everyman's Bible Commentary series. He was editor of Journal of the Evangelical Theological Society from 1962 to 1975. 

In 1983 a Festschrift was published in his honor. The Living and Active Word of God: Studies in Honor of Samuel J. Schultz included essays by F. F. Bruce, Millard Erickson, Norman Geisler, Walter Kaiser, Harold Lindsell, Merrill Tenney, and Ronald Youngblood.

References

1914 births
2005 deaths
People from Mountain Lake, Minnesota
American biblical scholars
American Mennonites
Mennonite writers
Old Testament scholars
Academic journal editors
Bible commentators
Bethel University (Minnesota) alumni
Bethel University (Minnesota) faculty
Harvard Divinity School alumni
Wheaton College (Illinois) faculty
Gordon College (Massachusetts) faculty
Members of the Christian and Missionary Alliance
Baptist ministers from the United States
American Congregationalist ministers